Kim Tae-seong or Kim Tae-sung may refer to:
 Kim Tae-seong (composer), South Korean composer
 Kim Tae-seong (cinematographer), South Korean cinematographer who won the Korean Association of Film Critics Awards for Best Cinematographer in 2011
 Kim Tae-seong (footballer) (born 1993), South Korean football/soccer player in the United States
 Kim Tae-sung (footballer) (born 1997), South Korean football player transferred to J2 League team Zweigen Kanazawa in winter 2015–2016